Rodrigo Defeo Manicad Jr. (born November 15, 1974), popularly known as Jiggy Manicad, is a Filipino television news producer/reporter and newscaster.

He was formerly an anchor of the weekend edition of GMA Network's flagship news program 24 Oras and on GMA News TV's Quick Response Team before resigning from the network in April 2018 and running as senator on the 2019 Midterm Elections under PDP–Laban. Later after the election, he return to GMA Network due to his work with Marnie Manicad and the Team MMPI clients for the show Agripreneur.

Early life and career
Rodrigo Defeo Manicad Jr. is the son of Rodrigo Manicad Sr. and Lusviminda Defeo Manicad. He was born on November 15, 1974. He finished elementary and secondary in San Pablo Colleges. He took Communication Arts in the University of the Philippines Los Baños. As a kid, he loved animals specially dogs. As a matter of fact, his dog Tikboy was chosen as one of the K-9 dogs of the National Bureau of Investigation (NBI). He worked as assistant editor of the International Rice Research Institute (IRRI). Years later, he found himself back in Manila, becoming one of the writers of the popular show Magandang Gabi, Bayan in ABS-CBN. He later transferred to GMA Network for he wanted to become a newscaster. He got the shot and is currently working as a reporter of Reporter's Notebook. During the May 1, 2001, Riot in Mendiola, San Miguel, Manila, he was seriously injured his head in the middle of the riot between the protesters and the authorities.

His stories include insurgency and extremism in Mindanao, disasters and the illegal arms trade. In 2004, he was awarded the British Chevening Scholarship Award. He then took a postgraduate course in International Broadcast Journalism at Cardiff University in Wales. He was chosen from 800 applicant-journalists from all over the country. As part of the program, he had his practicum at the BBC in Norwich, England. He is also an awardee of Ten Outstanding Young Men for 2012 for journalism.

On April 20, 2018, Manicad announces his departure from GMA Network and resignation from media service during his program, News TV Quick Response Team, after the prospective senatorial candidate under the ruling PDP–Laban political party for 2019 midterm elections. After the senatorial debates, Jiggy Manicad return to GMA for his sole show, Agripreneur.

Awards and nominations

References

External links
 
 

1974 births
Living people
People from Quezon City
Bicolano people
People from Camarines Norte
University of the Philippines Los Baños alumni
Filipino television news anchors
Filipino reporters and correspondents
GMA Network personalities
GMA Integrated News and Public Affairs people